Crawford Lake is a lake in the Magnetawan River drainage basin in the township of Magnetawan, Almaguin Highlands region, Parry Sound District, Ontario, Canada. The primary inflows are the Neighick River and Wylie Creek. The primary outflow is a channel to Beaver Lake, which flows via The Narrows channel into Ahmic Lake on the Magnetawan River, and thence into Lake Huron.

See also
List of lakes in Ontario

References

Lakes of Parry Sound District